Melancholy is an 1840-1841 oil on canvas painting by the Italian artist Francesco Hayez, now in the pinacoteca di Brera in Milan.

The artist describes the work in his Memorie:

The work was a popular success, leading Hayez to paint a second version, completed in 1842 and entitled Pensiero malinconico (Melancholy Thoughts). Hayez wrote in his Memorie that it had "many variations, changing the figure's character and adding flowers", reflecting the few but substantial differences from the previous work - the clothes are differently arranged, leaving the breasts more exposed and enhancing the poignant sense of abandonment, whilst the hands hang down rather than are intertwined and the face is more emotionally charged. The artist's treatment of flowers continued in his 1881 Vase of Flowers at the Window of a Harem.

References

Paintings by Francesco Hayez
Paintings in the collection of the Pinacoteca di Brera
1841 paintings